James Rand McNally III (born January 30, 1944) is an American politician. He is the 50th lieutenant governor of Tennessee. A member of the Republican Party, he has been the state senator from the 5th district since 1987.

Early life and education
McNally was born in Boston and later graduated from Oak Ridge High School in 1962, obtained a Bachelor of Science (BS) from Memphis State University in 1967, and graduated from University of Tennessee College of Pharmacy in 1969.

Career
Beginning in the late 1960s, he worked as a pharmacist in chain drug stores. In 1978, he began employment as a hospital pharmacist at Methodist Medical Center in Oak Ridge, Tennessee. McNally has served in the Tennessee General Assembly since 1979. He was elected to the 91st through 94th General Assemblies as a member of the Tennessee House of Representatives. He was a key figure in the Operation Rocky Top investigation in the late 1980s, when he worked undercover to help the Federal Bureau of Investigation and Tennessee Bureau of Investigation obtain evidence on political corruption in the Tennessee state government.

He moved to the State Senate for the 95th General Assembly in 1987 and has served there continuously since then. McNally was a candidate for lieutenant governor and Speaker of the Senate in 2007, but fellow Republican Ron Ramsey was elected. On January 10, 2017, he was elected lieutenant governor and Senate Speaker by the state senate.

Personal life
McNally is Roman Catholic. He and his wife, Janice, have two daughters.

In February 2023, McNally underwent emergency heart surgery after having symptoms of an irregular heartbeat. Doctors at Vanderbilt University Medical Center installed a pacemaker for McNally. He returned to the Tennessee Senate one week later.

Instagram controversy
In March 2023, it was reported McNally had used his verified Instagram account to ‘like’ and comment on sexually suggestive social media posts on the Instagram account of a 20-year-old gay man. Various LGBT groups criticized McNally and accused him of hypocrisy, due to his support for socially conservative laws, including Tennessee Senate Bill 3. A spokesman for McNally stated he “enjoys interacting with constituents and Tennesseans of all religions, backgrounds and orientations on social media" and "has no intention of stopping."

About a week later, state Rep. Todd Warner (R-Chapel Hill) released a statement calling on McNally to step down and accusing him of being a predator. Warner, who is in a separate chamber (the House) from McNally, was asked by reporters why he released the statement. He responded, “You can tell.”

References

Further reading
Sandra Roberts, Before Tennessee Waltz, there was Rocky Top. The Tennessean, June 5, 2005.
Larry Daughtrey, Lieutenant governor's contest may be a mystery worth decoding.  The Tennessean. May 28, 2006.

External links

Senator Randy McNally, Tennessee General Assembly website
Senator James Randy McNally, Project Vote Smart

1944 births
21st-century American politicians
American pharmacists
Living people
Republican Party members of the Tennessee House of Representatives
People from Oak Ridge, Tennessee
Republican Party Tennessee state senators
Lieutenant Governors of Tennessee
Politicians from Dedham, Massachusetts
LGBT_conservatism_in_the_United_States